In mathematics, a Coulomb wave function is a solution of the Coulomb wave equation, named after Charles-Augustin de Coulomb. They are used to describe the behavior of charged particles in a Coulomb potential and can be written in terms of confluent hypergeometric functions or Whittaker functions of imaginary argument.

Coulomb wave equation
The Coulomb wave equation for a single charged particle of mass  is the Schrödinger equation with Coulomb potential

The solution – Coulomb wave function – can be found by solving this equation in parabolic coordinates

Depending on the boundary conditions chosen, the solution has different forms. Two of the solutions are

The two boundary conditions used here are

which correspond to -oriented plane-wave asymptotic states before or after its approach of the field source at the origin, respectively. The functions  are related to each other by the formula

Partial wave expansion 
The wave function  can be expanded into partial waves (i.e. with respect to the angular basis) to obtain angle-independent radial functions . Here .

A single term of the expansion can be isolated by the scalar product with a specific spherical harmonic

The equation for single partial wave  can be obtained by rewriting the laplacian in the Coulomb wave equation in spherical coordinates and projecting the equation on a specific spherical harmonic 

The solutions are also called Coulomb (partial) wave functions or spherical Coulomb functions. For , one defines the special solutions 

where

is called the Coulomb phase shift. One also defines the real functions

In particular one has

where

The solutions  correspond to incoming and outgoing spherical waves.
In particular one has the following partial wave expansion for the wave function

Properties of the Coulomb function 
The radial parts for a given angular momentum are orthonormal. When normalized on the wave number scale (k-scale), the continuum radial wave functions satisfy 

Other common normalizations of continuum wave functions are on the reduced wave number scale (-scale),

and on the energy scale

The radial wave functions defined in the previous section are normalized to 

as a consequence of the normalization

The continuum (or scattering) Coulomb wave functions are also orthogonal to all Coulomb bound states

due to being eigenstates of the same hermitian operator (the hamiltonian) with different eigenvalues.

Further reading
.

.

References

Special hypergeometric functions